Lecithocera kambanella is a moth in the family Lecithoceridae. It was described by Viette in 1986. It is found in Madagascar.

References

Moths described in 1986
kambanella
Moths of Madagascar